BC Novosibirsk is a professional basketball team based in Novosibirsk, Russia. It plays in the Russian Super League, the second highest level of basketball in Russia.

In 2015, they won the Russian Cup by beating Dynamo Moscow in the Final. Novosibirsk repeated its success in 2017, defeating PSK Sakhalin.

Trophies
Russian Basketball Super League 1 (1):
2014–15
Russian Cup (2):
2014–15, 2016–17

References

External links
Official website  

Basketball teams in Russia
BC
Basketball teams established in 2011
2011 establishments in Russia